Zanqufa (also spelled Zanqufeh) is a village in northwestern Syria, administratively part of the al-Haffah District, located northeast of Latakia. It is situated along the southern edge of city of al-Haffah. According to the Syria Central Bureau of Statistics, Zanqufa had a population of 928 in the 2004 census. 

During the 1919-20 revolt against French rule in Syria, Zanqufa was used as a base of guerrilla operations and training by rebel leader Izz ad-Din al-Qassam.

References

Bibliography

Populated places in al-Haffah District